Down With Webster is a Canadian rap rock band from The Beaches area of Toronto who signed with Universal Motown in April 2009.

Down with Webster was originally formed for a middle school talent show. The band released their first official EP, Time to Win, Vol. 1, on October 6, 2009. The band has achieved success from all three singles from the album, and all three were certified Platinum in Canada. The album itself was certified Platinum in Canada. Their second release, Time to Win, Vol. 2, was released on October 31, 2011. In 2014, they put out their second full-length album, Party For Your Life.

Down with Webster has sold over one million albums and nearly one million singles. The band has been nominated for Juno Awards, MuchMusic Video Awards, and Canadian Radio Music Awards.

History

1998–2008: Early years
Down with Webster originally started as a instrumental jazz band that was formed for a music class at Glen Ames Senior Public School in 1998 by band members Patrick "Pat" Gillet and Tyler Armes. In mid-2003, the band released a six-track CDR EP titled The Reverb Session July '03. This release was primarily sold at shows and local concerts from July 2003 to 2004. In 2007, they released an independent self-titled album.

The band played at Lee's Palace in the 2008 Canadian Music Week. Their performance was described by Jill Langlois of Chart as "one of the best shows I've ever seen" and "the band exploded onto the stage and never slowed down or stopped. Words will never really describe the Down With Webster experience." The magazine described the band as "flashy and obnoxious, but fun and loveable". The band also won the Rogers Mobile/Universal Music best unsigned artist in Canada award. KISS frontman Gene Simmons and later, Timbaland had expressed interest in signing the band to their respective labels. According to Timbaland, "That group is the most amazing and creative, innovative group that's going to come out in 2010." Armes commented about Simmons' interest, "To be honest, I don't think it was the right fit. Don't get me wrong, it was totally flattering to have Gene Simmons show up unannounced on every media platform possible to talk about us, but it seemed like there was the potential to lose control of certain elements and no one really felt like gambling at this point. Ultimately, we were already down the aisle with Universal/Motown."

2009–2010: Time to Win, Vol. 1 and success
The band's debut EP Time to Win, Vol. 1 was released on October 6, 2009. In the fall of 2009, DWW opened for Forever the Sickest Kids on the Cheap Date Tour. Down with Webster also opened for Timbaland on two dates in February 2010 on the Shock Value II Tour.The lead single from EP "Rich Girl$" debuted on the Canadian Hot 100 at No. 47 for the week of October 24, 2009, and peaked at No. 21 on the issue of January 9, 2010.  The video for "Rich Girl$" was posted to YouTube/VEVO on January 12 and crossed the 1 million views mark in July. The follow-up single, "Your Man", was released to Canadian radio stations in January 2010. It has peaked at No. 12 on the Hot 100, outperforming their debut single. In April 2010, both "Your Man" and "Rich Girl$" were certified double platinum in digital downloads by the CRIA.

Down with Webster's first headlining tour, WINtour 2010, had the band tour Canada and the United States in January and February 2010. The tour started in Halifax on January 7 and ended on February 1 in Vancouver. The band also opened for The Black Eyed Peas on one date in The E.N.D. Tour in Sarnia, Ontario.

Down with Webster were nominated for "New Group of the Year" at the 2010 Juno Awards, losing to Arkells. The band was also nominated for "UR Fave: New Artist" as well as "Pop Video of the Year" at the 2010 MuchMusic Video Awards, although Justin Bieber won "UR Fave: New Artist", and Hedley won "Pop Video of the Year". Down with Webster won the "Online Artist of the Year" at the 2010 Canadian New Media Awards.

The third single "Whoa Is Me", was released on June 15, 2010, and peaked at No. 13 on the Canadian Hot 100 for the week of October 16, 2010. Over the summer, they played at festivals such as the SCENE Music Festival, and the Ottawa Bluesfest Down with Webster was one of the six artists featured on the global music event "Doritos Late Night", where a 360-degree music video for "She's Dope", which became the first single of Time to Win, Vol. 2, was featured on the Doritos Late Night website. The event launched on October 20, 2010, and also included Rihanna, Professor Green, Mor ve Otesi, Teargas, and Sensacional Orchestra Sonora.

Down with Webster was featured on 2010 Year End Charts several times. Both "Your Man" and "Whoa Is Me" were on the 2010 Canadian Hot 100 Year End Chart, "Your Man" at No. 37 and "Whoa Is Me" at No. 85. Down with Webster was at No. 21 on the Canadian Hot 100 Artists Chart, surpassing both Justin Bieber and Drake. In December 2010, Time to Win, Vol. 1 was certified Gold in Canada, and in January 2011, the single "Whoa Is Me" was certified Platinum.

2011–2012: Time to Win, Vol. 2
In an interview, Cameron "Camm" Hunter stated that after finishing the Streets Of Gold Tour with 3OH!3 and Hellogoodbye, the band would "lock ourselves in the studio for a couple of months" and finish Time to Win, Vol. 2. The tour was completed on November 24, 2010, at Albuquerque, New Mexico. They then performed at the pregame show for the 98th Grey Cup. In December 2010, Down with Webster announced WINtour 2011, a cross-Canada tour which would support their upcoming album, Time to Win, Vol. 2. The tour began on February 22, 2011, in Lethbridge, Alberta and ended on March 12 in Toronto.

Down with Webster were nominated for two awards at the 2011 Canadian Radio Music Awards: "SOCAN Song of the Year" and "Best New Group or Solo Artist (Contemporary Hit Radio)". On February 1, 2011, it also announced that Down with Webster had been nominated for two awards at the Juno Awards of 2011, Group of the Year and Pop Album of the Year. The band also performed at the awards ceremony on March 27, 2011, at the Air Canada Centre. The band was nominated for four 2011 MuchMusic Video Awards, which ties them for the most nominations with Fefe Dobson and Shawn Desman. The band won one award at the 2011 MuchMusic Video Awards, Pop Video of the Year for "Whoa Is Me".

On May 12, 2011, the band shared that hype man Kyle "Kap Ten/Oneoh" Fairlie was no longer in the band, citing their reason as "6 guys going in one musical direction that didn't quite fit with the 7th."

The band played at summer festivals and exhibitions including the Red River Exhibition, and at Salmonfest in Grand Falls-Windsor, where they opened for Kiss.

Time to Win, Vol. 2 was released on October 31, 2011, and reached No. 9 on the Canadian Albums Chart. The first single from the album, "She's Dope", was released on May 23, 2011. It peaked at No. 18 on the Hot 100. "Big Wheels" was released as the album's second single on September 9, 2011. The song peaked at No. 51 on the Hot 100. On December 20, 2011, the band released iTunes Session, an EP that featured live versions of songs from the album.

In 2012, they released a music video for "Royalty". The band made a cameo appearance in the film The Movie Out Here later that year.

2013–2017: Party for Your Life, hiatus and other projects

As of March 20, 2013, the band uploaded the single "One in a Million", from an untitled upcoming album, to their YouTube channel. The band continued to open for Marianas Trench on the second leg of the Face The Music Tour in Canada after opening for them in the fall of 2012. On August 13, 2013, the band released the song "Party for Your Life".

It was later revealed that Party for Your Life is also the name of the upcoming album, originally scheduled for release on October 22, 2013. On October 14, the band confirmed via Facebook that the album would be pushed back to January 2014, because they wanted to include newer material in the album. The album was officially released on January 28, 2014. Down With Webster's version of "Saturday Night" was played during the NHL's 2013-14 season on Hockey Night in Canada. The third single from the album, "Chills", was released on December 17, 2013. The video premiered on March 7, 2014.The band officially released the music video for the track "Going Nowhere" through Sony Entertainment on January 31, 2014, making the video announcement of the release on their YouTube channel. Amanda Hather of Canadian Beats gave the album a 4.5/5, saying "Whether you are a fan of all of the genres that Down With Webster somehow manage to mix into their songs, there is something for everyone on this album." Davina Sinnatamby of Tangible Sound gave the album a 4/5, closing her review with "So if you feel like a shot of something stronger that caffeine or alcohol; I'd recommend listening to this whole album. The songs don't just make you want to get up and dance; the fast rhythms, smooth rhymes and poetic lyrics make you want to live forever." On February 9, 2014, a different version of "Feel So Alive" was played during the CBC Olympic broadcasts of the 2014 Winter Olympics.

The band toured from 2014-2015 across Canada and the US. In the summer of 2014 at the Festival of Friends, they met Emmanuel Lewis, who starred as the titular character, Webster, whom had inspired their band name. In the US, they toured with many artists, including Hoodie Allen, Timeflies, and Jonny Craig.

In 2016, Armes released 2 songs that he had written with Gillett, who also does vocals on both tracks, under the name Best Night Ever. The proceeds from the singles supported Kids Help Phone and The Trevor Project.

After a few years without producing any music or performing any live shows, the band posted on their Facebook on June 2, 2017, that they would be going on a hiatus. Gillett, Armes, Hunter, and Martino formed a new band called Honors. They released an album titled “Feel Better” on November 6, 2018. Bucky has started a new project called Karter Park with original Down with Webster member, Kierscey. Ferris has built a following as a DJ in Toronto.

2020-2021: V and return
The band returned in 2020, releasing their surprise single "Love Is Not Enough". They later released another single that  year called "Take Us Alive". In 2021, the band released their 5th album V which was recorded back in 2015. Armes said that it was their last album.

Hunter has continued to release solo albums and helped direct music videos for artists such as Civic TV, Hodgy, and Tyler Shaw. Armes and Martino are both currently songwriters and producers. Martino has worked on Hunter's music as well as Victoria Duffield's and Theo Tams'. Armes created the scores for the CBC series, Anyone's Game and Run the Burbs.  Gillett currently releases music independently and has opened about his personal struggles in the past few years.

Members

Past members
 Cameron "Camm" Hunter — rap vocals, vocals (1998–2021)
 Martin "Bucky" Seja — rap vocals, vocals (2003–2021)
 Patrick "Pat" Gillett - guitar, rap vocals, vocals (1998–2021)
 Tyler Armes — bass guitar, keyboards (1998–2021)
 Andrew "Marty" Martino — drums (2003–2021)
 Kyle "Kap Ten/Oneoh" Fairlie — hype man (2006–2011)
 Dave "Diggy The DJ" Ferris - DJ, turntables  (2006-2014)

Influences

Their influences range across many genres including pop, rock, hip-hop, jazz, and electronic music. Armes has cited Michael Jackson and electronic artists Justice and Skrillex, and jazz fusion musicians Stanley Clarke and Jaco Pastorious as inspirations, while Gillett and Hunter has credited hip-hop groups Beastie Boys, Wu-Tang Clan, Cypress Hill and rock bands Rage Against the Machine, Led Zeppelin, Aerosmith, and Soundgarden for helping the band shape their genre-bending music.

Discography 

 2007: Down with Webster
 2009: Time to Win, Vol. 1
 2011: Time to Win, Vol. 2
 2014: Party for Your Life
 2021: V

Concert tours

Awards and nominations

Down With Webster has been nominated for 22 awards including 12 MuchMusic Video Awards and 6 Juno Awards.

Canadian New Media Awards

|-
| 2010 || Down With Webster || Online Artist of the Year ||

Canadian Radio Music Awards

|-
| rowspan="2"| 2011 || "Rich Girl$" || Best Group or Solo Artist || 
|-
| "Your Man" ||SOCAN Song of the Year || 
|-
| 2014 || Down with Webster || Heatseeker ||

Juno Awards

|-
|  || Down With Webster || New Group of the Year || 
|-
| rowspan="2"|  || Down With Webster || Group of the Year || 
|-
| Time to Win, Vol. 1 || Pop Album of the Year || 
|-
| rowspan="2"|  || Down With Webster || Group of the Year || 
|-
| Time to Win, Vol. 2 || Pop Album of the Year || 
|-
|  || Party for Your Life || Pop Album of the Year ||

MuchMusic Video Awards

|-
| rowspan="2"| 2010 || "Your Man" || Pop Video of the Year || 
|-
| "Rich Girl$" || UR Fave: New Artist || 
|-
| rowspan="4"| 2011 || rowspan="4"| "Whoa Is Me" || Video of the Year || 
|-
| Pop Video of the Year || 
|-
| UR Fave: Video || 
|-
| UR Fave: Artist || 
|-
| rowspan="4"| 2012 || rowspan="2"|"She's Dope" || Video of the Year || 
|-
| MuchFact Indie Video of the Year || 
|-
| "Royalty"|| Director of The Year || 
|-
| "Big Wheels" || Post Production of the Year || 
|-
| 2013 || "One in a Million" || Pop Video of the Year || 
|-
| 2014 || "Chills" || Pop Video of the Year ||

Rogers Mobile/Universal Music Best Unsigned Artist

|-
| 2008 || Down With Webster || Rogers Mobile/Universal Music Best Unsigned Artist ||

SOCAN Awards

|-
| 2015 || "Chills" || Pop/Rock Music Award||

References

External links
 
 
 
 Universal Motown website
 UpVenue Interview with Down with Webster

Musical groups established in 1998
Musical groups from Toronto
Canadian hip hop groups
Rap rock groups
Motown artists
1998 establishments in Ontario
Musical groups disestablished in 2015
2015 disestablishments in Ontario
Universal Motown Records artists